Stigmella crotonica is a moth of the family Nepticulidae. It was described by Scoble in 1978. It is found in Zimbabwe (it was described from Mount Selinda).

The larvae feed on Croton sylvaticus. They probably mine the leaves of their host plant.

References

Nepticulidae
Moths of Africa
Moths described in 1978